Šaltenis is a Lithuanian language family name. It may refer to:
Saulius Šaltenis, Lithuanian politician
Rapolas Šaltenis, Lithuanian  journalist, author, translator, and teacher
Aldona Jonuškaitė-Šaltenienė, Lithuanian ceramic artist

Lithuanian-language surnames